Hyoran Kauê Dalmoro (born 25 May 1993), known simply as Hyoran, is a Brazilian footballer who plays as an attacking midfielder for Atlético Mineiro.

Club career

Early career
Born in Chapecó, Santa Catarina, Hyoran appeared for Paraná, Coritiba and Corinthians' youth setup before making his senior debuts while on loan at Flamengo de Guarulhos. He returned to Corinthians in January 2012, being subsequently released.

Chapecoense
Hyoran signed for Chapecoense shortly after, being initially assigned to the under-20s. He was promoted to the main squad in 2013, but was never used during the campaign, as his side was promoted to Série A for the first time ever.

Hyoran made his first team – and top level – debut on 6 September 2014, coming on as a late substitute for Camilo in a 0–0 home draw against Goiás. He was made a starter in 2015 by manager Vinícius Eutrópio, also scoring a brace in a 5–2 away win against Interporto for the season's Copa do Brasil.

On 28 November 2016, Hyoran did not board LaMia Airlines Flight 2933 for the 2016 Copa Sudamericana Finals, which crashed and killed 19 of his teammates, due to an injury.

Palmeiras

On 9 November 2016, Hyoran agreed to a pre-contract with fellow top tier club Palmeiras, effective the following January.

Atlético Mineiro
On 8 January 2020, Hyoran joined Atlético Mineiro on a season-long loan. On 23 February 2021, he signed for the club on a permanent basis and a three-year deal, for a €1.15 million fee.

Loan to Red Bull Bragantino
On 13 January 2022, Atlético announced an agreement for the season-long loan of Hyoran to Red Bull Bragantino.

Career statistics

Honours
Chapecoense
Campeonato Catarinense: 2016
Copa Sudamericana: 2016

Palmeiras
Campeonato Brasileiro Série A: 2018

Atlético Mineiro
Campeonato Brasileiro Série A: 2021
Copa do Brasil: 2021
Campeonato Mineiro: 2020, 2021

References

External links

1993 births
Living people
People from Chapecó
Brazilian footballers
Association football midfielders
Campeonato Brasileiro Série A players
Sport Club Corinthians Paulista players
Associação Atlética Flamengo players
Associação Chapecoense de Futebol players
Sociedade Esportiva Palmeiras players
Clube Atlético Mineiro players
Red Bull Bragantino players
Sportspeople from Santa Catarina (state)